(Al-) Minya may refer to:

Places and jurisdictions 

 Minya Governorate in Egypt
 Minya, Egypt, capital city of the Minya Governorate; Ancient Egyptian name Men'at Khufu, meaning the nursing city of Khufu
 The Coptic Catholic Eparchy of Minya
 Khirbat al-Minya, the remains of an Umayyad qasr (fortified palace) on the Sea of Galilee

Other 

 Minya (Xena), a character from the TV series Xena: Warrior Princess
 Minilla, the titular son of the film Son of Godzilla, referred to as "Minya" in dubbed English versions

Similar names 
Places (Mina, Menea)
 El Mina, Lebanon
 El Mina, Mauritania
 El Golea (Arabic: القلعة) is an oasis town and commune in Ghardaïa Province, Algeria. The official name is "El Menea".

Other
 Netron Menya, a Russian steam battleship; see the list of Russian battleships

See also
 Minia (disambiguation)